Demetrio "Mino" Carta (Genoa, 6 September 1933) is an Italian-born Brazilian journalist, publisher and writer. Carta helped in the creation of Veja, Istoé and CartaCapital, three of the four leading newsmagazines currently published in Brazil.

Biography
Carta arrived in São Paulo, São Paulo with his family after the War in 1946, when he "still wore short pants". He was probably 12 or 13 years old at that time. He recalls São Paulo as a "quiet and orderly" town with "human measures".

In 1951, Carta did a vestibular exam and was admitted at the University of São Paulo's traditional Law School of Largo São Francisco. His enrollment records state that he was born on September 6, 1933. He attended the classes of the first years, but quit and ended up never graduating from higher education.

In 1960 he started his career in journalism by helping to found Editora Abril automobile magazine Quatro Rodas. In 1966, he introduced new journalism in Brazil by founding São Paulo-based newspaper Jornal da Tarde. Two years later, he helped Victor Civita of Abril to found Veja, which currently is the leading newsmagazine in the country, with a circulation of over a million copies per edition. Unsatisfied with the result, he helped in the foundation of Istoé in 1976. Yet not completely satisfied with the result, he founded CartaCapital in 1994. On the new magazine, he and other columnists emphatically criticize neoliberal and neocon politics that are recently defended by Veja.

Of all the publications Carta helped create during his life, only one, the defunct Jornal da República, failed to succeed. The 1970s newspaper had a large deficit on its budget.

Disappointed with the position of Luiz Inácio Lula da Silva in the Cesare Battisti case, Carta decided to retire from his blog and his column on CartaCapital.

Published books
In 2000, Carta released his first novel, titled O Castelo de Âmbar (The Castle of Amber), in which he narrates a semi-biographical story. The main character, Mercúcio Parla, may be his alter-ego; Parla narrates what he considers to be the promiscuous relationship between politicians, journalists and media thanes during almost half a century in the recent History of Brazil. Written as a fictional story, some connections may be done with the reality, such as the character's home land "Ausônia" being Italy and his house on "Rua Áurea" being Rua Augusta.

In 2003, Carta published his second novel A Sombra do Silêncio (The Shadow of Silence), a follow-up to O Castelo de Âmbar. In this book, the main character finds himself on the Rua Áurea with Cuore Mio, "the most laughing girl in the neighbourhood", starting what is described by the author as the "only and authentic love of their lives".

Awards
2003: Comunique-se Award for Best Businessperson of a News Vehicle – CartaCapital
2005: Comunique-se Award for Best Businessperson of a News Vehicle – CartaCapital
2006: Award of the Association of Foreign Press Correspondents in Brazil for Most Prestigious Journalist of the Year
2007: Comunique-se Award for Best Businessperson of a News Vehicle – CartaCapital

Notes

References

External links
Mino's blog
CartaCapital official website

Year of birth missing (living people)
Living people
Brazilian journalists
Brazilian columnists
Italian emigrants to Brazil
University of São Paulo alumni
Brazilian male writers
Brazilian newspaper founders
Brazilian magazine founders